Allium douglasii, the Douglas onion, is a plant species native to northeastern Oregon, eastern Washington, and northern Idaho.

Two grooved leaves usually remain during the flowering stage.

References

External links 
 

douglasii
Flora of Idaho
Flora of Oregon
Flora of Washington (state)
Onions
Plants described in 1839
Taxa named by William Jackson Hooker
Flora without expected TNC conservation status